Dave Bainbridge is an English guitarist and keyboard player who has played with The Strawbs since 2015. With Dave Fitzgerald, Dave co-founded the Christian progressive and Celtic folk themed band Iona.

Biography
Born in Darlington, England from a musical family. Dave had piano lessons from the age of eight and learnt guitar from thirteen. He joined his first band 'Exodus' at fourteen.

Dave went to Leeds College of Music, gaining the "BBC Radio 2 Best Jazz Soloist Award" whilst there. Whilst at college Dave, met singer and songwriter Adrian Snell. The result was a working partnership spanning eight years and through which he would first meet Joanne Hogg and David Fitzgerald. This partnership went on to be the founding force behind the group Iona.

Dave toured the world with Iona between 1989 and 2015, releasing 13 critically acclaimed albums. Dave’s multi-faceted career as a solo artist, keyboardist, guitarist,  bouzouki player, composer, improviser, producer, arranger, teacher and sound mixer has led him into many musical genres and work with numerous artists including: Strawbs (current keyboardist), Jack Bruce, Buddy Guy, Troy Donockley (Nightwish), Nick Beggs, Gloria Gaynor, Moya Brennan, Robert Fripp, Mae McKenna, Phil Keaggy, Paul Jones, Damian Wilson, Nick Fletcher, ‘Snake’ Davis, Adrian Snell, PP Arnold, Mollie Marriott, Lifesigns (with John Young), Norman Beaker, Fred T Baker, Dave Brons, Paul Bielatowicz and many others.

Winner of the BBC Radio 2 Best Jazz soloist award (piano) and the Sam Hood Rosebowl for Outstanding Performance during his time at Leeds Music College (where he graduated with first class honours and a distinction in arranging), Dave has composed soundtracks for numerous short films, TV and multimedia productions and has co-written a guitar concerto with Classic FM favourite Nick Fletcher, released on the album ‘Cathedral of Dreams’ (2009).

Dave has released four solo studio albums, ‘Veil of Gossamer’ (2004), ‘Celestial Fire’ (2014), his first solo piano album ‘The Remembering’ (2016), and ‘To the Far Away’ (2021). The ‘Celestial Fire’ album led to the formation of the band of the same name in 2015 and the Celestial Fire band ’Live in the UK’ DVD/2 cd album was released in April 2017.

Dave has also released two collaborative albums with Troy Donockley and two with Iona's David Fitzgerald.

Current live projects include his new band Celestial Fire, Strawbs, the Dave Bainbridge & Sally Minnear duo, Lifesigns, and occasional solo concerts. Dave was arranger & musical director for Adrian Snell’s sell out live performances in The Netherlands of his works ‘The Passion’, ‘Light of the World’ and 'Alpha and Omega', all of which feature a full band of top Dutch session musicians, vocal soloists and a 60 piece choir.

"Dave Bainbridge is a genius of immeasurable proportions….working with artists as varied as Buddy Guy, Jack Bruce and IONA. If you are unfamiliar with him it's time to make amends. Trust me."
Nick Beggs (Kajagoogoo / Steve Wilson / Steve Hackett etc., etc.)

"I've been listening to 'Celestial Fire' and I love it!  Wow… That's some amazing stuff man! Really one of the best albums I've heard in a while."
Neal Morse (Spock's Beard / Transatlantic / Flying Colors)

“Dave is both a solo artist and a major driving force behind the band Iona. His fluid, emotional guitar playing, epic keyboard work and expansive compositions combine into one of this generation’s most powerful and original musical voices.” 
John Kellogg (producer for Britney Spears, Chicago, Foreigner, Black Crows, Deep Purple, ELP)

“Bainbridge's guitar playing is superb; his electric solos conjure Eric Johnson and Allan Holdsworth, while his acoustic technique dazzles, thanks to a remarkable dexterity and the use of unusual tunings.…”
www.progressiveworld.net

“Celestial Fire is absolute sonic brilliance!”
Chris  MacIntosh 88.1fm WCWP New York

“Soaring guitar passages, stunning keyboard work, and inspirational waves of orchestral prog.” Bert Saraco

Musical description
A multi-instrumentalist and songwriter, Bainbridge's solo material continues in the style established in Iona, fusing progressive rock, Celtic folk, classical and improvisational elements in a unique way.

A number of members of Iona have recorded solo albums, or co-operated on each others.

Discography 
Iona's and Dave's solo & collaboration are albums available from www.iona.uk.com/store.

Solo
Veil of Gossamer (2004)
Celestial Fire (2014)
The Remembering (2016)
Live in the Studio (DVD) (2018) Dave Bainbridge & Sally Minnear
To the Far Away (2021)

Celestial Fire Band
Celestial Fire - Live in the UK (2017)

With Iona
see Iona for a list of their recordings

With Dave Fitzgerald
Eye of the Eagle (1998)
Eye of the Eagle (DVD) (2005)
Life Journey (Dave Bainbridge) (2009)

With Troy Donockley
When Worlds Collide (2005)
From Silence (2005)
From Silence (DVD) (2005)

With Strawbs
The Ferryman's Curse (2017)
Settlement (2021)

With Lifesigns
Cardington (2017)
Altitude (2021)

Other collaborations
Songs for Luca (2003) (with other Iona members and various other artists)
Songs for Luca 2 (2007) (with other Iona members and various other artists)
Breaking of the Dawn  (2007) (with Nick Fletcher, featuring Yvonne Lyon)
Cathedral of Dreams  (2009) (with Nick Fletcher)
Chronofonia (2020) (with an international ensemble)
Halcyon Hymns (2021) (with Downes-Braide Association)

References

External links
 Official website
 Iona's Official Website

British performers of Christian music
English rock keyboardists
English rock guitarists
English male guitarists
People from Darlington
Year of birth missing (living people)
Living people
Strawbs members
Lifesigns members
20th-century British guitarists
20th-century English musicians
20th-century British male musicians
20th-century British musicians
21st-century British guitarists
21st-century English musicians
21st-century British male musicians
Musicians from County Durham